Welcome to Mexico... Asshole is the first live album from Pigface. Trent Reznor of Nine Inch Nails is featured on "Suck", (which was remade for his Broken EP as a hidden track) but Ogre is the primary lead vocalist.

Track listing

Personnel 
 Martin Atkins - drums
 Bill Rieflin - drums
 Chris Connelly - vocals
 Nivek Ogre - vocals
 Paul Raven - bass
 Matthew Schultz - guitar, keyboards
 William Tucker - guitar
With Additional appearances, on various tracks of the following artists:
Paul Barker, Bart Flores, Eric Pounder, Beefcake The Mighty, Marston Daley, Michael Balch, Tom Lash, Joe Trump, Black Francis, Mary Byker, Roberto Santiago, Chris Vrenna, Neil Hubbard, Bobby Rea, Andy MaGuire, Evil Mothers, Jeff Ward, Dave Kendricks, En Esch, Becky Wreck, Silverfish, Trent Reznor, John Wills and David Yow.

References

Pigface albums
1991 live albums